Beyblade Burst Evolution, known in Japan as Beyblade Burst God (ベイブレードバースト神, Beiburēdo Bāsuto Kami (Goddo)), is a 2017 anime series and the second season of Beyblade Burst. The series was produced by D-rights and TV Tokyo and animated by OLM, and it premiered on all TXN stations in Japan on April 3, 2017. An English dub of the anime premiered on Teletoon in Canada on November 4, 2017 and on Disney XD in the United States on December 4, 2017. The opening theme is "Evolution Burst!" The ending themes are "Beyxercise" for the first 26 episodes and "Beyxercise 2" for the remainder of the series.



Episode list

References 

Burst Season 2
2017 Japanese television seasons
2018 Japanese television seasons